Daulatpur is an upazila of Manikganj District in the Division of Dhaka, Bangladesh.

Geography
Daulatpur Upazila (manikganj district|) area 216.24 km2, located in between 23°54' and 24°02' north latitudes and in between 89°41' and 89°57' east longitudes. It is bounded by chauhali and nagarpur upazilas on the north, shivalaya and ghior upazilas on the south, saturia upazila on the east, bera upazila and jamuna river on the west.

Main rivers: Jamuna, dhaleshwari and ichamati; Gaighata canal and Khalsi beel are notable.

Demographics
At the 2001 census Bangladesh census, Population Total 155674; male 78557, female 77117; Muslim 146834, Hindu 8814, Buddhist 20 and others 6. Males constituted 49.62% of the population, and females 50.38%.

Average literacy rate of Daulatpur upazila people is 28.37%; male 34.71%, female 22.01%.

Administration
Daulatpur Thana was formed in 1919 and it was turned into an upazila in 1983.

Daulatpur Upazila is divided into eight union parishads: Bachamara, Baghutia, Chakmirpur, Charkataree, Dhamswar, Khalshi, Klia, and Zionpur. The union parishads are subdivided into 172 mauzas and 188 villages.

Education
Educational institutions: college 3, secondary school 21, primary school 158, madrasa 29. Noted educational institutions: Taluknagar College (1972), Daulatpur Matilal College (1972), Bachamara College (1972), Daulatpur Pilot High School (1949), Bachamara High School (1950), Kalia High School (1964), Baghutia High School (1964), Taluknagar High School (1965), Charkatari Sabuj Sena High School (1966), Charmastul High School (1969), Kakna High School (1967), Khalsi High School (1968).

See also
 Upazilas of Bangladesh
 Districts of Bangladesh
 Divisions of Bangladesh

References

External links
 

Upazilas of Manikganj District